Finegold may refer to:
Finegold, California, former name of Fine Gold, California, community in Madera County
Barry Finegold (1971–), American politician
Ben Finegold (1969–), American chess International Grandmaster
Finegold Alexander Architects, American architecture firm
Gina Linn Finegold, Belgian and American chess player
Sydney M. Finegold (1921–2018), American physician and medical researcher

Jewish surnames
Yiddish-language surnames
Surnames from ornamental names